Leah Mascall (born 23 May 1995) is a retired Australian rules footballer who played for the Fremantle Football Club in the AFL Women's (AFLW). Mascall was drafted by Fremantle with their seventh selection and forty-fourth overall in the 2017 AFL Women's draft. After an anterior cruciate ligament injury prevented her from playing in the 2021 AFL Women's season, Mascall retired in April 2021.

References

External links 

1995 births
Living people
Fremantle Football Club (AFLW) players
Australian rules footballers from Western Australia